Pigment epithelium-derived factor (PEDF) also known as serpin F1 (SERPINF1), is a multifunctional secreted protein that has anti-angiogenic, anti-tumorigenic, and neurotrophic functions. Found in vertebrates, this 50 kDa protein is being researched as a therapeutic candidate for treatment of such conditions as choroidal neovascularization, heart disease, and cancer. In humans, pigment epithelium-derived factor is encoded by the SERPINF1 gene.

Discovery 

Pigment epithelium-derived factor (PEDF) was originally discovered by Joyce Tombran-Tink and Lincoln Johnson in the late 1980s. This group was studying human  retinal cell development by identifying secreted factors produced by the retinal pigmented epithelium (RPE), a layer of cells that supports the retina. Upon noticing RPE produced a factor that promoted the differentiation of primitive retinal cells into cells of a neuronal phenotype, they set out to determine the identity of the factor. They isolated proteins unique to RPE cells and tested the individual proteins for neurotrophic function, meaning promoting a neuronal phenotype. A neurotrophic protein around 50 kilodaltons (kDa) was identified and temporarily named RPE-54 before being officially termed pigment epithelium-derived factor.

Soon thereafter, the same laboratory sequenced the PEDF protein and compared it to a human fetal eye library. They found that PEDF was a previously uncharacterized protein and a member of the serpin (serine protease inhibitor) family.

Gene

The gene encoding human PEDF was localized to the 17th chromosome at position 17p13.1. The human PEDF gene is around 15.6kb, and the mRNA transcript is around 1.5kb. Immediately upstream of the PEDF gene lies a 200bp promoter region with putative binding sites for the transcription factors HNF4, CHOP, and USF. The PEDF gene consists of 8 exons and 7 introns.

The PEDF gene is present in vertebrates from human to fish, but not present in sea squirts, worms, or fruit flies. Sea squirts express several serpin genes, suggesting that the PEDF gene may have arisen from another serpin family member after the evolution of vertebral animals. The gene most homologous to PEDF is its adjacent neighbor on chromosome 17, SerpinF2.

Protein 

The PEDF protein is a secreted protein of roughly 50kDa size and 418 amino acids in length. The N-terminus contains a leader sequence responsible for protein secretion out of the cell at residues 1-19. A 34-mer fragment of PEDF (residues 24-57) was shown to have antiangiogenic properties, and a 44-mer (residues 58-101) was shown to have neurotrophic properties.  A BLAST search reveals a putative receptor binding site exists between residues 75-124. A nuclear localization sequence (NLS) exists about 150 amino acids into the protein. The additional molecular weight is partly due to a single glycosylation site at residue 285. Near the C-terminus at residues 365-390 lies the reactive center loop (RCL) which is normally involved in serine protease inhibitor activity; however, in PEDF this region does not retain the inhibitory function.

In 2001, the crystal structure of PEDF was successfully generated. The PEDF structure includes 3 beta sheets and 10 alpha helices. This discovery demonstrated that PEDF has an asymmetrical charge distribution across the whole protein. One side of the protein is heavily basic and the other side is heavily acidic, leading to a polar 3-D structure. They proposed that the basic side of the protein contains a heparin binding site.

Signaling 

PEDF expression is upregulated by plasminogen kringle domains 1-4 (also known as angiostatin) and the kringle 5 (K5) domain. Hypoxia, or low oxygen conditions, leads to the downregulation of PEDF. This effect is due to hypoxic conditions causing matrix metalloproteinases (MMPs) to proteolytically degrade PEDF. In addition, amyloid beta has been shown to decrease PEDF mRNA levels.

Secreted PEDF binds a receptor on the cell surface termed PEDF-R. PEDF-R has phospholipase A2 activity which liberates fatty acids from glycerolipids. PEDF enhances gamma-secretase activity, leading to the cleavage of the VEGF receptor 1 (VEGFR-1) transmembrane domain. This action interferes with VEGF signaling thereby inhibiting angiogenesis. Laminin receptor is also a target for PEDF, and the interaction occurs between residues 24-57 of PEDF, a region known to regulate antiangiogenic function.

PEDF induces PPAR-gamma expression which in turn induces p53, a tumor suppressor gene involved in cell cycle regulation and apoptosis. Thrombospondin, an antiangiogenic protein, is upregulated by PEDF. PEDF stimulates several other well known signaling cascades such as the Ras pathway, the NF-κB pathway, and extrinsic apoptosis cascades.

Function 

PEDF has a variety of functions including antiangiogenic, antitumorigenic, and neurotrophic properties. Endothelial cell migration is inhibited by PEDF. PEDF suppresses retinal neovascularization and endothelial cell proliferation. The antiangiogenic residues 24-57 were shown to be sufficient at inhibiting angiogenesis. 
PEDF is also responsible for apoptosis of endothelial cells either through the p38 MAPK pathway or through the FAS/FASL pathway Antiangiogenic function is also conferred by PEDF through inhibition of both VEGFR-1 and VEGFR-2.

The antitumorigenic effects of PEDF are not only due to inhibition of supporting vasculature, but also due to effects on the cancer cells themselves. PEDF was shown to inhibit cancer cell proliferation and increase apoptosis via the FAS/FASL pathway.  VEGF expression by cancer cells is inhibited by PEDF.

PEDF also displays neurotrophic functions. Retinoblastoma cells differentiate into neurons due to the presence of PEDF. Expression of PEDF in the human retina is found at 7.4 weeks of gestation, suggesting it may play a role in retinal neuron differentiation.

Clinical significance 

PEDF, a protein with many functions, has been suggested to play a clinical role in dry eye, choroidal neovascularization, cardiovascular disease, diabetes, diabetic macular edema, osteogenesis imperfecta and cancer. As an antiangiogenic protein, PEDF may help suppress unwanted neovascularization of the eye. Molecules that shift the balance towards PEDF and away from VEGF may prove useful tools in both choroidal neovascularization and preventing cancer metastasis formation.

References

External links 
 The MEROPS online database for peptidases and their inhibitors: I04.979